Kato Platres also known as Tornarides is a mountainous village in Cyprus. It is located on the southern slopes of the Troödos Mountains and is one of the Krasochoria (wine village).

External links
 Kato Platres Official Homepage

Communities in Limassol District